Gentle Thoughts is the second solo album by Lee Ritenour, and was released as a Direct-to-disc recording. It features Ernie Watts, Dave Grusin, Patrice Rushen, Anthony Jackson, Harvey Mason and Steve Forman.

Track listing

Side one
"Captain Caribe/Getaway" – 9:57
"Chanson" (Dave Grusin) – 3:55
"Meiso" (Harvey Mason, Sr.) – 5:18

Side two
"Captain Fingers" – 5:36
"Feel Like Makin' Love" (Gene McDaniels) – 4:48
"Gentle Thoughts" (Herbie Hancock, Melvin "Wah Wah" Ragin) – 8:41

Personnel
 Lee Ritenour – electric guitar
 Ernie Watts – saxophone, flute
 Dave Grusin – piano, Fender Rhodes
 Patrice Rushen – piano, Fender Rhodes
 Anthony Jackson – bass guitar
 Harvey Mason – drums
 Steve Forman – percussion

References

External links
 

1977 albums
Lee Ritenour albums